Territorial nexus is a concept described in Article 245 of the Constitution of India that determines how legislative powers are divided.

Article 245 provides, inter alia, that (subject to the provisions of the Constitution).

Thus, the article 245 sets out the limits of the legislative powers of the Union and the States from the geographical (or territorial) angle. From the point of view of the subject matter of legislation, it is article 246 which is important. Article 246 reads as under:

Leading cases
 Tata Iron and Steel Company vs. Bihar State (AIR 1958 SC 452)
 State of Bihar Vs. Sm. Charusila Dasi (AIR 1959 SC 1002)
 The State Of Bombay vs R. M. D. Chamarbaugwala (1957 AIR 699, 1957 SCR 874)

References

1949 in law
 
Indian documents
Tax law